Prizyv was a daily newspaper published in Berlin, Germany from June 22, 1919 to March 14, 1920. It is notorious for having translated and republished A Protocol of 1919 from the Estonian newspaper Postimees. The 1934 300-page compilation of the Protocols of the Elders of Zion allegedly quotes from this paper this antisemitic item. Says Walter Laqueur:

On these ideological rubbish dumps, Prizyu, a daily newspaper published in Berlin, flourished for a brief period in 1919-1920. The German right-wing extremist press was supplied for years with information first published in Prizyv during its nine months of existence.

See also
The Protocols

References

Defunct newspapers published in Germany
Daily newspapers published in Germany
German-language newspapers
Newspapers published in Berlin
Newspapers established in 1919
Publications disestablished in 1920